Dragon Tales is an  animated educational fantasy children's television series created by Jim Coane and Ron Rodecker and developed by Coane, Wesley Eure, Jeffrey Scott, Cliff Ruby and Elana Lesser and produced by Sony Pictures Television, Sesame Workshop, Columbia TriStar Television, and Adelaide Productions. The story focuses on the adventures of two ordinary kids, Emmy and Max, and their dragon friends Ord, Cassie, Zak, Wheezie, and Quetzal. The series began broadcasting on PBS on their newly-renamed PBS Kids block on September 6, 1999,  with its final episode on November 25, 2005 (the show was dropped from the PBS Kids lineup on August 31, 2010). Yearim Productions was responsible for the animation for all seasons (Sunwoo Entertainment and Wang Film Productions only did animation for season 1), with the exception of Koko Enterprises, which recorded the show along with BLT Productions. The Corporation for Public Broadcasting, The U.S. Department of Education, cereal company Kellogg's and their associated products Rice Krispies, Froot Loops and Frosted Flakes, and greeting card manufacturer, American Greetings were responsible for the funding.

Background

Origin 
Dragon Tales is based on characters created in 1978 by Laguna Beach, California artist and retired educator Ron Rodecker. Rodecker was recovering from a coronary artery bypass graft when he began sketching dragons as a means of symbolizing forces in life that were too big to control. In 1995, Jim Coane, then a producer at Columbia TriStar Television, found the artwork and developed it into a television series with several writers. The project was considered something of a risky venture, because it was not based on a well-known franchise like many children's television programs, such as Arthur or Paddington Bear. The series was immediately shipped to PBS member stations at the suggestion of PBS, but all originally passed at the time. In October 1995, Jim Coane met Marjorie Kalins, senior VP of programming and production at Children's Television Workshop, and showed her the idea for the series. Kalins, who loved the idea, brought the series to Children's Television Workshop, who agreed to a partnership with the Columbia TriStar Television Group. Kalins helped him and Columbia TriStar Television obtain an $8.5 million grant from the Department of Education and the Corporation for Public Broadcasting. The grant proposal was written by Wesley Eure. Coane stated that there was never any consideration of trying to shop the program to a commercial broadcast network and that PBS was, in his mind, the only destination for the program. As Columbia TriStar was the TV division of two major Hollywood film studios, which in turn are owned by the Sony Pictures Entertainment division of Japanese multinational conglomerate Sony, Dragon Tales became one of the few PBS Kids and Sprout programs to be co-produced by a major Hollywood studio's TV subsidiary; The other PBS shows were Bill Nye the Science Guy (made by Walt Disney Television), and Curious George (produced by Universal Television). In 2002, CTTV was renamed to Sony Pictures Television, a company that would co-produce the third season of the program.

After a tour of the lot of Sony Studios, Wesley Eure created the first treatment of the show, including the initial conception of the two-headed dragon Zak and Wheezie, back then known as "Snarf and Bugger." The series received a massive multi-million dollar grant from the federal government, beating out The Muppets and Sesame Street for the request. As part of the conditions for the grant, Eure was required to create a companion series for the program, which he titled Show and Tell Me, based on his own lecture series known as "Anyone Can Write a Book." Though the companion series was never actually created, Eure remains hopeful that it will one day be produced. Eure's name was not included in the initial credits for the series, forcing him to hire an attorney to ensure that he received credit.

Following the development of a show bible by Jeffrey Scott, with some tweaks by writers Cliff Ruby and Elana Lesser, the series was ordered for just over 60 eleven-minute episodes by PBS. Scott was assigned to write and edit half, with Ruby/Lesser assigned to the other half. At this point, the writing team was provided with a document titled "FUN AND LEARNING IN DRAGON LAND: A Writer's Guide to Dragon Tales Educational Content" which provided directives as to which curriculum should be included within the stories, such as "emotional challenges > understanding other people's emotions > recognizing and labeling feelings in others" and the statement that "CURRICULUM IS PARAMOUNT!"  After the creation of the first script, all writing parties involved agreed that the scripts "weren't fun or funny, they were flat and boring." The writers successfully explained to the consultants, educators and psychologists of PBS that children watch television to be entertained and must be entertained in order to be educated. They were then provided with a new directive, "Come up with entertaining stories and shoehorn in the curriculum wherever it fits!" Scott states that from the experience he learned an invaluable lesson about how to create a successful preschool series. Dong Woo Animation, Rough Draft Korea, Sunwoo Entertainment, Wang Film Productions (season 1 only), Yearim, Siriol Productions (season 3 only) and Lotto Animation contributed some of the animation for this series.

Show premise and overview

The series focuses on the adventures of Emmy and Max, two human siblings. Upon moving into their new house, they find an enchanted dragon scale which, upon reciting a special rhyme engraved into its box, can magically transport them to Dragon Land, a whimsical fantasy world inhabited by colorful dragons. Befriended by four friendly dragons with distinctive personalities - the fearful, but strong Ord; the shy, yet sweet-natured Cassie; and polar opposite twins, neat-freak Zak and rambunctious Wheezie - the two children frequently travel to Dragon Land and help their friends in fulfilling particular quests, assisting them in their daily problems, and learning important morals through their experiences in Dragon Land. 

The dragons also each have their own dragon badges that glow when they accomplish something they usually have trouble with. For example, Ord's glows when he is brave. Cassie's glows when she overcomes her anxiety. Zak and Wheezie's glow when they overcome their differences and work together.

In an effort to educate preschoolers mildly in Hispanic culture, a new character named Enrique debuted during the show's final season, providing the series with a third protagonist. Surrounded by a variety of unique characters and faced with numerous differing situations, Emmy and Max commonly embark on adventures with their dragon friends, conquering fears or achieving goals in spite of any obstacles along the way.

As a series broadcast on PBS, the program has an educational focus, combining lessons of a pro-social nature with those of more general educational value. Educational themes covered included identifying shapes, learning words and letters in both English and Spanish, counting and basic math. Social themes are also covered, such as good sportsmanship, the importance of being a good friend, overcoming obstacles such as jealousy or fears and getting along with siblings. Many of the show's interstitial song segments, known as "Dragon Tunes," also covered such themes, such as "Make It Fun", which encourages viewers to not complain about having to do seemingly mundane chores such as washing dishes or helping parents with cooking meals, but instead find ways to make them fun; and "Hum," which encourages those who had a fear of the dark or trying new things to hum softly to comfort themselves. Three stated goals of the program's educational philosophy are the encouragement of pursuing new experiences, finding ways to approach and learn from challenges and that learning can come through trying and not succeeding entirely. Despite two of the show's human leads, Emmy and Enrique, being six years old, the show's described target audience was children closer to the age of four.

Another key topic of the program is the encouragement of honest and candid expressions of emotion. In "Cassie, the Green-Eyed Dragon," Cassie feels jealous of her little brother, Finn, who gets everyone's attention when she takes him to school for "circle time." Discussing the matter with her best friend, Emmy, and her teacher, Quetzal, helps her to understand that jealousy is a natural feeling that everyone experiences sometimes, but that there are ways that she can appreciate her brother, while still feeling appreciated herself. In "Feliz Cumpleaños, Enrique," Enrique feels sad and homesick for his homeland of Colombia when his birthday celebrations in Dragon Land are not like the traditions of those back in his old home. He talks with Quetzal, who encourages him to cry, even though he had been told that crying was something a boy at his age was not supposed to do. After doing so, he feels better and is able to enjoy his party celebrations.

As with Sesame Street, which is also produced by the Children's Television Workshop (now Sesame Workshop), the program's creators encourage "co-viewing," the practice of parents or other caregivers watching the program along with their children and engaging in activities such as discussion, singing and dancing, and pretend play. The program's official website offers a number of activities and lesson plans to aid in these efforts.

Characters

Main
Emmy (voiced by Andrea Libman) is a 6-year-old brunette girl, who commonly appears as the leader of the group until she gave her position to Enrique while helping him get used to Dragon Land. She's Max's older sister. Her best friend is Cassie, and she's perhaps known for saying "Definitely!" whenever a good idea arises. Though Emmy is not ashamed to do "girly" things with Cassie, she's also heavily into sports and games and generally is up for any activity. Though she experiences occasional jealousy of her brother, the 2 are otherwise usually together within Dragon Land and share many adventures. Though a brave, smart natural leader, she's also impulsive and does not always think before she acts. She's typically seen wearing a blue button-up dress over a red short sleeve shirt.
Max (voiced by Danny McKinnon) is 4 years old, and is Emmy's younger brother. For the most part, he and Emmy get along fine, but occasionally have arguments due to him being prone to anger. His best friend is Ord. Though Max loves Emmy, he sometimes struggles with being the younger brother, and is usually frustrated about being too little to do certain things, or when Emmy acts in certain ways. He's of an adventurous sort and sometimes helps to give courage to Ord when he's afraid of certain things. He's kind to others, but often enjoys acting silly or goofy. He sometimes acts in a stubborn manner, determined to prove that a child his age can do things on his own, even when he really needs help. He usually wears a green short-sleeved shirt with yellow on the collar and edges of the shirt-sleeves and brown slacks. Max was named after the son of executive producer Jim Coane.
Enrique (voiced by Aida Ortega) is 6 years old. He is Emmy and Max's new best friend and next-door neighbor who moved from Colombia to the United States and also once lived in Puerto Rico. He is raised by his father and his grandmother ("abuelita")  He first appears in the Season 3 episode "To Fly with a New Friend", and travels to Dragon Land with the children when Max encourages Emmy to share their secret. His recent experiences in South America provide more opportunities for the characters to demonstrate the meanings of new Spanish words. He misses his homeland of Colombia and saddened by reminders of times from his old home. He rides with Zak and Wheezie, the two-headed dragon who rarely flew with any human friends prior to Enrique's debut in Season 3. His personality is somewhat bashful but he is sometimes shy to join in on new experiences.  However, he finds that he enjoys himself when he allows himself to let go, express his feelings and then move forward to have fun. He's raised by his grandparents and described as an intensely smart, good, and logical character. A series of moves throughout his early life has left him jaded and wary of both making new friends and trying new things. He normally wears a yellow short-sleeved shirt and blue jeans. Enrique received mixed reviews. The presence of Enrique on the program, in conjunction with Max and Emmy, was the subject of a study "'They Are?!' Latino Difference vis-à-vis Dragon Tales," which was critical of the show's use of the characters, feeling that the series ultimately "undermines multiculturalism because it fails to nurture children's ability to live fearlessly with and within difference."
Ord (voiced by Ty Olsson) is a strong blue male dragon who is Max's best friend. He is extremely fond of food and always carries some just in case; a running gag in the show features Ord making "Dragon Corn" by throwing the kernels in the air and popping them with his fire breath. He's also allergic to dandelions. Despite his physical strength, Ord is sometimes scared due to his fear of the dark and thunder, and possesses a magical tendency to turn invisible when he is upset or frightened. Ord's sun-shaped Dragon Badge glows when he faces his fears. Ord is extremely sweet and kind in nature, he learns moral lessons when he is not kind. For instance, in "Kingdom Come" he refuses to share his huge cupcake, but finally gives in and learns moral lessons. 
Cassie (voiced by Chantal Strand) is a shy, cute, reserved and sweet pink female dragon who is Emmy's best friend. She possesses a magical tendency to shrink when she is too shy, sad, or scared, may occasionally come across as slightly insecure and uncertain, and is prone to worrying, especially about making a mistake. However, Cassie is distinguished by her kind heart and maternal sweetness, primarily as a result of her responsibilities as an older sister and babysitter to a myriad of younger siblings. Cassie also is characterized by her color combination of pink and yellow, along with blue speckles in some areas. Cassie knows just about everything there is to know about Dragon Land and has a deep love of fairytales, both stemming from her love of reading, as well as being an amazing singer and dancer. Her dragon orb-shaped badge glows when she feels confident and believes in herself.
Zak and Wheezie (voiced by Jason Michas and Kathleen Barr, respectively) are conjoined twin green and purple dragons with opposite personalities; Zak is male, and Wheezie is female. Zak is neat and clean, worries a lot, and is pessimistic about many things. His catchphrase is "Take it easy, Wheezie!", which he often says when Wheezie takes off running, dragging him with her. Wheezie, on the other hand, is bold, hyper, confident, and free-spirited, with a tendency to be messy, much to her brother's annoyance. Her catchphrase is "Love it!", when she loves something. The two have a shared love of music and performing and they often perform in talent shows and recitals together. Zak and Wheezie always fly with Enrique, though they rarely flew with any human friends in the first two seasons. In the third season, Enrique became their partner following his debut. Their dragon badges are musical notes that glow when they work together and get along, though they will sometimes glow independently when one of them accomplishes something on their own of significance. Although they fight a lot, they are very close and they love and care about each other a lot. In the episode "Not Separated at Birth" the viewers get a view of what Wheezie and Zak would look like separately as if they were born that way. They get in a fight and Queztel decides to grant them their request to be separated. Finally being able to live separately, it is short lived as they want to be back together.
Quetzal (voiced by Eli Gabay) is an elderly yellow male dragon originally from Mexico who is the teacher at The School in the Sky where young dragons attend. He tries to encourage his students to find solutions to their problems on their own, but is a sounding board who offers stability and comfort, as well as sound advice. In the episode "Snow Dragon", Quetzal mentions it has been hundreds of years since he visited the dragon snow sculpture as a child, implying he is centuries old. He speaks Spanish with a very strong accent. He also has an identical twin brother named Fernando who works in his garden.

Supporting
 Arlo (voiced by Scott McNeil) is an orange male dragon who works at the Dragon Dump. He has a machine at the Dragon Dump which he calls his "lil' ol' recycler" that sorts out things that can be used again.
 Dr. Booboogone (voiced by Shirley Milliner) is a veteran pink dragon who works as a doctor who helps dragons and other species who are sick or hurt. She wears a doctor's coat.
 Captain Scallywag (voiced by Scott McNeil) is a pirate who captains a flying ship.
 Chilly (voiced by French Tickner) is a living snowman who lives on top of the Stickleback Mountains with his snowdog Nippy.
 Cyrus (voiced by Ian James Corlett) is a conniving lizard-like slinky serpent, the main antagonist of the show. He often tries to steal others' eggs to eat.
 The Doodle Fairy is a fairy with green skin and purple dress. She does not speak but can doodle.
 Eunice (voiced by Janyse Jaud) is a winged unicorn. She cannot see very well, so she wears glasses.
 Finn (voiced by Ellen Kennedy) is Cassie's younger brother. He is light blue, toddler-aged, attached to his blankie, and only just learning to fly. He is prone to tantrums when upset.
 The Giant of Nod (voiced by Blu Mankuma on most appearances and Paul Dobson in "Much Ado About Nodlings" only) is the leader of a group of gnome-like creatures called the Nodlings. While much bigger than his fellow Nodlings, he is smaller than any of the main characters but is enormously strong.
 Princess Kidoodle is the ruler of the Doodle Fairy Kingdom. She seems to be much older than any other doodle fairies.
 Kiki (voiced by Ellen Kennedy) is Cassie's younger sister. Kiki is light green. She seems slightly younger than Finn and still wears diapers and drinks from a bottle. She is attached to her "squishy", an oddly-shaped seed that she enjoys squeezing.
 The Little Bird with the Big Eyes, is a bird that lives in the Forest of Darkness who has big round eyes. She is described by Max every time she leaves them as "nice bird!"
 Lorca (voiced by Lenore Zann) is Max, Emmy, Zak, Wheezie, Ord and Cassie's friend. He was born without wings and can use a wheelchair because he was born this way and is incapable of flight. Despite his physical limitations, however, Lorca enjoys participating in adventures and sports activities and encourages his friends to think of new ways to do things.
 Norm (voiced by Stevie Vallance) is a friendly little gnome who loves to count.
 Monsieur Marmadune (voiced by Cusse Mankuma) is the main ruler and leader of Kingdom Come, who tells Ord that Kingdom Come is the happiest place a dragon could ever be.
 Mr. Pop (voiced Ian James Corlett) is a gnome-like character that temporarily steals Wheezie's laugh with his sound switcher.
 Mungus (voiced by Garry Chalk) is a giant who lives in a castle in the clouds. He knows many folks in Dragon Land since he can travel far and wide in just a few steps.
 Polly Nimbus (voiced by Kathleen Barr) is the operator of the cloud factory, which controls Dragon Land's weather. 
 Poozy is a fairy with butterfly wings that was once Cassie's pet caterpoozle. She looks similar to the Doodle Fairy and like the Doodle fairy she does not speak.
 Priscilla (voiced by Erin Fitzgerald) is the manager at the lost and found, who during her first appearance, was feeling embarrassed because her wings were bigger than those of other dragons. She eventually realized that there is nothing wrong with being different when she uses her big wings to help Mungus clean up his castle in a "different" way.
 Sid Sycamore (voiced by Scott McNeil) is a talking tree who loves telling jokes that relate to the concept of trees, the dragons' tree house is attached to him. When upset, the children will sometimes go to talk to him to be cheered up by his jokes. (See "Emmy's Dreamhouse / Dragon Sails" [sic] regarding use as a treehouse.)
 Slurpy (voiced by Stevie Vallance) is Zak and Wheezie's pet furball.
 Spike is a brief student who loves his YoYo but he is also a mean bully whenever he gets sad or alone. He is paired up with Cassie when the group picks Dragon Plums. He bullies Cassie and when she gets upset about this, Quetzel advises her to be friends with Spike. Because Quetzal implied that Spike might be a bully because he is sad and alone, much like how Cassie shrinks when she is shy, scared or sad.
 Windy (voiced by Erin Fitzgerald in Season 1, Maggie Blue O'Hara in Seasons 2-3) is a little wind that likes to blow like her father.
 Wyatt (voiced by Doug Parker) is a talking wishing well that immediately grants any wish for a single coin. He's old friends with Quetzal. Whenever coins pile up too high, he knows it is time for them to be emptied and taken to the First Dragon Land Bank. Earlier in the series, he was called Willy.

Release history 
Dragon Tales premiered on PBS Kids on September 6, 1999 with the episode "To Fly with Dragons/The Forest of Darkness." The installment introduced the characters of Max and Emmy to Dragon Land after discovering a magical dragon scale in their new home and to their new dragon friends. In the first half, they discovered Ord's missing tooth, while the adventures continued in the second story with Ord facing his fear of the dark. A total of forty episodes were aired in the first season, with the finale airing on April 28, 2000. The show also aired on the original PBS Kids Channel until that network's closure in 2005. Dragon Tales was the only CTW show airing on the PBS Kids Channel due to Noggin having the cable rights to air shows from the CTW's programming library (including its flagship series Sesame Street). The show's second season premiered on June 4, 2001 and had 25 episodes. 20 of these episodes were broadcast from June 4, 2001 to September 14, 2001. The final installment of this set, "Just the Two of Us/Cowboy Max," was broadcast only in non-U.S. markets such as Guam and Canada and did not premiere to U.S. audiences until the program's third season, though "Cowboy Max" was released on DVD prior to this. The special "Let's Start a Band!," featuring the dragon characters blended with live humans in a musical show based on the program's "Dragon Tunes" segments, was released on March 2, 2003. Following this, no new episodes were aired until February 21, 2005, leading many long-time viewers to believe the program had been quietly canceled. The new season introduced the new character Enrique, an immigrant from Colombia, as well as an updated focus on folk songs and teaching of Spanish. The premiere installment, in two parts, showed Enrique being introduced to the sights and sounds of Dragon Lands, learning to fly on Zak & Wheezie, and having his first adventure. The second half appeared as "The Mystery of the Missing Knuckerholes" in some listings, but on the program was simply titled as Part 2 of the episode. Though 29 episodes were broadcast, including "Just the Two of Us/Cowboy Max," only one story from each was original, while the others were a repeat of a story from the second season. The series officially concluded with the "Big, Big Friends Day" special on November 25, 2005.
Dragon Tales would continue to air in reruns on the PBS Kids block (and sister channel Sprout) until August 31, 2010.

The program's first musical album, Dragon Tunes, was released on March 20, 2001 and featured the character themes of Cassie and Ord, as well as tunes such as "Betcha Can," the "Wiggle Song" and "Shake Your Dragon Tail." A second album, More Dragon Tunes, was issued on February 15, 2005. This album introduced the character theme of Zak & Wheezie, as well as a number of new tunes introduced in the program's second and third seasons, including "Hola," "Make a New Friend" and remixes of two previous themes, "Shake Your Dragon Tail" and "Dance."

Throughout its history, a number of tie-in book releases were printed, some based on installments of the television program, others not. These included Cassie Loves a Parade, Ord Makes a Wish and Taking Care of Quetzal.

A special, Parent Tales from Dragon Tales, was produced in association with the program. The program was stated to use "messages built into the children's series to inform parental challenges. From bedtime dramatics to tantrums and assorted other small-fry rebellions..." For the special, parents were given video cameras used to record problematic behavior, then counselors analyzed the video footage and provided specific tips to the parents, who all reported significantly improved behavior two months later. The researchers also discovered from their work on the series that children often think in pictures and that visual aids are often helpful.

Music and songs
Dragon Tales featured an original score composed by Jim Latham and Brian Garland. Each episode also included an interstitial segment between story airings known as "Dragon Tunes," featuring a song either based on one of the characters of the show, or designed to teach a lesson, such as "Stretch!", which encouraged viewers to reach forward for their goals and "When You Make a New Friend," which espoused the joys of forming a new friendship. The songs were released on the albums Dragon Tunes and More Dragon Tunes.

Episodes

Dragon Tales aired a total of 94 episodes, 40 in its first season, 24 in its second season and 30 in its third season. Each episode featured two original stories, aired back-to-back, split by the interstitial song segment "Dragon Tunes," all of which were eventually released on the show's music albums. Almost all episodes from the third season, however, generally contained at least one repeat of a story from the program's second season (As evidenced by the absence of Enrique.) and some were even repeats of material from that season and earlier material from the third season. In all, there were a total of 155 original stories. The show also had two specials: Let's Start a Band and Big, Big Friend Day. Let's Start a Band was a musical feature in which the characters of the show were seen alongside real human children. Big, Big Friend Day, however, was merely a special featuring episodes of Dragon Tales and Clifford the Big Red Dog, with interstitial segments introducing characters from the new series (new at the time) It's a Big Big World. As such, it did not contain any new Dragon Tales material.

Reception
The series has received generally positive reviews (although the third season's reception was more mixed). Common Sense Media rated the show a four out of five stars, stating, Dragon Tales intends to positively impact a child's growth and development by encouraging a love of learning and helping children problem-solve and work through the challenges of growing up. The kids and dragons embark on different adventures and attend the School in the Sky, all while learning how to face their fears and handle new situations. The fun, nurturing, and sometimes challenging atmosphere of Dragon Land is a lot like preschool."

Awards
2000 Parents' Choice Silver Award Winner
2001 Parents' Choice Approved Award Winner (for "Dragon Tales: Dragon Tunes" CD)
2003 Parents' Choice Silver Award Winner (for "Let's Start a Band" video)
2005 Parents' Choice Approved Award Winner (for "Dragon Tales: More Dragon Tunes" CD)

The series was nominated for three Daytime Emmy Awards for Outstanding Children's Animated Program in 2001, 2002 and 2003, but did not win any. Jason Michas and Kathleen Barr also received Annie Award nominations in 2000 for their performances of Zak and Wheezie respectively.

In other media

Video games 

On November 29, 2000, a video game based on the series, Dragon Tales: Dragon Seek, was released for the PlayStation. Published by NewKidCo, the player takes control of either Emmy or Max as the player navigates them through Dragon Land playing hide and seek, searching for either Ord, Cassie, Zak and Wheezie, Monsieur Marmaduke or Captain Scallywag that are hiding in certain areas in each level, the player would also have a choice to pick what character they want to search for at the beginning.

On December 16, 2000, another video game, Dragon Tales: Dragon Wings, was issued for Game Boy Color. Issued by NewKidCo, the game allowed players to take on the role of a novice dragon that was learning the secrets of flight at Quetzal's School in the Sky. Players moved through 15 levels of obstacles available in three difficulty levels. Reviews were mixed at Amazon.com, with an overall rating of 3/5 stars from ten reviewers. Many praised the graphics and fun of the game, but also felt that the game was too challenging for most younger players and did not offer much educational value.

On July 28, 2001, a third video game titled Dragon Tales: Dragon Adventures was released for Game Boy Color. Also issued by NewKidCo, the game included journeys to familiar locations from the show including the Stickleback Mountains, the Singing Springs and Crystal Caverns. The game included multiple skill settings and the option to play as Cassie, Ord, Emmy or Max, the title having been issued before the addition of Enrique to the series. The Game Boy Advance version was later released in 2004, which also makes Zak and Wheezie playable in that version.

The show's official website also included a number of tie-in games, such as "Finn's Word Game" and "Dragonberry Surprise," though following the discontinuation of the site, such titles are no longer available.

Marketing and merchandise
In addition to the various books, music albums and video game releases, numerous merchandise items featuring the characters of Dragon Tales were made available for purchase throughout the program's run. A total of six different designs featuring scenes from the program were featured on Welch's jam jars. An official board game for the series titled Dragon Tales: A Dragon Land Adventure, featured obstacles and memory games, with the goal of completing a puzzle. It was released by University Games and overall reviews were generally positive, though also expressed that the game was not very challenging. Other merchandise released for the series included plush toys for most of the major characters, such as Cassie and Quetzal though Enrique, seen only in the program's third season, was never released in plush form and was largely absent from merchandise releases. As early as January 1996, Hasbro reached an agreement for a line of plush, puzzles and board games related to the series to be released beginning in spring 2000.

For the program's video debut, multiple licensees, including Hasbro, Random House, Sony PlayStation and New Kid Toys promoted in tandem a "Dragon Tales Family Fun Getaway." Promoted via stickers on Dragon Tales merchandise and home video releases, the promotion was a contest with a grand prize of a four-day, three-night trip for four to San Diego, including a visit to the San Diego Zoo.

In 2001, Mott's ran a five-month Dragon Tales promotion with its apple juice packs. Dragon Tales character stickers were offered on 50 million packs. Additionally, 20 million bottles offered an instant win game with the top prize as a Dragon Tales themed party with the pink dragon Cassie and an additional 10,000 prizes of Dragon Tales books.

In October 2004, Scholastic Parent & Child selected the CD-ROM game Learn & Fly With Dragons as teachers' pick for best new tech.

Live events

A musical stage show called Dragon Tales Live! features the characters and concepts of the show. It toured nationally in the United States. It featured performers playing the dragons in full body costumes and two real children in each production playing the roles of Max and Emmy. Shows included the "Missing Music Mystery", "Journey to Crystal Cave"  and "The Riddle of Rainbow River."

Dragon Tales Live! toured from January 2002 until at least March 2006. The program was never modified to include the character of Enrique, who was not added until the program's final season, one year before productions of the stage show ended.

References

Citations

External links

 
 Parent Tales from Dragon Tales on the official PBS website (Internet Archive)
 Sony Pictures Television official Dragon Tales page (Internet Archive, DVD Series)
Dragon Tales - "A Magical World of Rainbow Rivers and Talking Trees", archive, on Sesame Workshop's official website
 Detail account of series' genesis
  at PBS
 PBS official website (Internet Archive, partially functional, circa introduction of Enrique)
 Official website of Dragon Tales Live stage show (Internet Archive)
Sesame Workshop official site as it appeared at CTW.org

1999 American television series debuts
1999 Canadian television series debuts
2005 American television series endings
2005 Canadian television series endings
1990s American animated television series
1990s Canadian animated television series
2000s American animated television series
2000s Canadian animated television series
American children's animated adventure television series
American children's animated fantasy television series
American preschool education television series
Canadian children's animated adventure television series
Canadian children's animated fantasy television series
Canadian preschool education television series
Animated preschool education television series
1990s preschool education television series
2000s preschool education television series
CBC Television original programming
English-language television shows
PBS Kids shows
PBS original programming
Animated television series about children
Animated television series about dragons
Animated television series about siblings
Television series by Adelaide Productions
Television series by Sesame Workshop
Television series by Sony Pictures Television
Television shows adapted into video games